Cortodera is a genus of beetles in the family Cerambycidae, containing the following species:

 Cortodera barri Linsley & Chemsak, 1972
 Cortodera bivittata Linsley & Chemsak, 1972
 Cortodera coniferae Hopping & Hopping, 1947
 Cortodera cubitalis (LeConte, 1861)
 Cortodera falsa (LeConte, 1860)
 Cortodera ferrea Linsley & Chemsak, 1972
 Cortodera fraudis Linsley & Chemsak, 1972
 Cortodera funerea Linsley & Chemsak, 1972
 Cortodera impunctata Hopping & Hopping, 1947
 Cortodera longicornis (Kirby in Richardson, 1837)
 Cortodera militaris (LeConte, 1850)
 Cortodera nitidipennis (Casey, 1913)
 Cortodera placerensis Hopping & Hopping, 1947
 Cortodera pseudomophlus (Reitter, 1889)
 Cortodera robusta Hopping & Hopping, 1947
 Cortodera spuria (LeConte, 1873)
 Cortodera stolida (Casey, 1924)
 Cortodera subpilosa (LeConte, 1850)
 Cortodera thorpi Linsley & Chemsak, 1972
 Cortodera tuberculicollis Linsley & Chemsak, 1972
 Cortodera vanduzeei Linsley & Chemsak, 1972

References

Lepturinae
Cerambycidae genera